David Scully (born 7 August 1965) is an English rugby union former player who was part of the England 7's squad that won the 1993 Rugby World Cup Sevens in which he won the ‘moment of the tournament' for a crunching tackle on Fijian Mesake Rasari.

Playing career
Dave Scully started his career at his local club of Wheatley Hills before joining Wakefield RFC in 1986.
It was at Wakefield that he came to prominence, playing for Yorkshire, North of England (captaining them against the All Blacks in 1993), Barbarians, England B and England 7's. However, he never played for the full England side.

He left Wakefield in 1998 to join Rotherham before moving onto Otley, then Doncaster and Sheffield Tigers. His current club is Wheatley Hills.

He has made over 350 league appearances  and is in a small group of players to score 100 league tries.

Scully is a full-time fire fighter.

References

External links
 Scully joins 100 try club
 350 league appearances
 Doncaster Knights squad
 Scully joins Sheffield Tigers

1965 births
Living people
Rugby union players from Doncaster
Barbarian F.C. players
English rugby union players
Rotherham Titans players
Wakefield RFC players
England international rugby sevens players